Woehr is a surname. Notable people with the surname include:

Andy Woehr (1896–1990), American baseball player
Marc C. Woehr (born 1973), German contemporary artist 

German-language surnames